Songs of the Civil War is a compilation album, released in 1991 by Columbia, that presents an assortment of contemporary performers recording period pieces and traditional songs, most of which date back to the American Civil War.

Track listing

Personnel

Chris Anderson – engineer
Hoyt Axton	– vocals, performer
Margaret Bailey – vocals
Dale Ballinger	– vocals
Kris Ballinger	– vocals
Russ Barenberg	– guitar, mandolin
Ysaye Barnwell	– vocals, shekere
Jerry Bridges – piano
Jim Brown – producer
Ken Burns – producer
Jesse Carr – vocals
Nitanju Bolade Casel – vocals, shekere
The Cluster Pluckers – vocals
Judy Collins – vocals, performer
William R. Cooley – guitar (acoustic)
Don DeVito – producer
Jerry Douglas – dobro
Frank Dubuy – conductor, musical consultant
Craig Duncan and the Smoky Mountain Band – dulcimer (hammer)
Stuart Duncan – mandolin
Mark Ferguson – engineer
Fiddle Fever – performer
Ronnie Gilbert – vocals, performer
Matt Glaser – fiddle, violin
Yasmeen Graham	– tambourine, vocals
Jeff Hale – drums
Evelyn Harris – vocals
Jamie Hartford	– mandolin
John Hartford – banjo, violin, arranger, vocals, performer, musical consultant
Richie Havens – guitar, vocals, performer
Mark Howard – guitar
Roy M. "Junior" Husky – bass
SFC Dave Hydock – engineer
Waylon Jennings – guitar, arranger, vocals, performer
Pat Jerina – design
Aisha Kahlil – vocals, shekere
Dane Lanken – vocals
Arthur Levy – liner notes
Nicky Lindeman	– art direction
Larry Loewinger – engineer
Staff Sgt. Steve Luck – trumpet
Molly Mason – bass, piano, vocals, performer, musical consultant
Kathy Mattea – guitar, vocals, performer
Anna McGarrigle – piano, accordion, vocals
Kate McGarrigle – guitar (electric), vocals
Libby McLaren – piano
Peter Miller – liner notes
John Mock – guitar, whistle (instrument)
Sgt. Paul Murtha – arranger
Bernice Johnson Reagon	– arranger, vocals, shekere, musical consultant
Johnny Rosen – engineer, mixing
Carol Ross – post production
Lisa Silver – vocals
Alan Silverman – engineer, mixing
Evan Stover – fiddle, vocals
Sweet Honey in the Rock – performer
Jay Ungar – banjo, fiddle, vocals, performer, musical consultant
The United States Military Academy Band – performer
Martha Wainwright – vocals
Rufus Wainwright – vocals, performer
Barry Walsh – guitar
Curtis Young – vocals
Joel Zifkin – violin
Mike Zook – engineer, mixing

References

1991 compilation albums
Columbia Records compilation albums
Compilation albums by American artists
Cultural history of the American Civil War
Folk compilation albums